Jimmy Eresto is a South Sudanese footballer who plays as a defender. He made his senior debut for South Sudan national football team in the 2013 CECAFA Cup and won the man of the match award.

References

Living people
1989 births
South Sudanese footballers
South Sudan international footballers
Association football midfielders